Golem Gaber is a village in the municipality of Karbinci, North Macedonia.

Demographics
As of the 2021 census, Golem Gaber had 20 residents with the following ethnic composition:
Turks 17
Persons for whom data are taken from administrative sources 3

According to the 2002 census, the village had a total of 32 inhabitants. Ethnic groups in the village include:
Turks 32

References

Villages in Karbinci Municipality
Turkish communities in North Macedonia